Glenn Roger Lyse (born in Stavanger, Norway on 4 April 1974) is a Norwegian singer, songwriter and musician who won season 4 of the reality television show Idol on 21 December 2007. with other finalist Bjørn Johan Muri becoming runner-up.

Prior to Idol, Lyse had followed a musical career for many years, playing solo and in various bands, most notably in the trio Nash and in partnership with Christer Knutsen, the 1990s band Jam Pack. In 1996, he had taken part in tv2 show Stjerner i Sikte.

After winning the Idol, he was signed for a record deal with Sony BMG that released his winning song "Days Go By".  This was followed by a second single "Guilty" in February 2008, just prior to the release of his debut album Come Closer released on 10 March 2008, with all songs (except the winning song "Days Go By") written by Lyse himself.

Discography

Albums

Singles

References

1974 births
Living people
Musicians from Stavanger
Idol (Norwegian TV series) participants
Idols (TV series) winners
21st-century Norwegian singers
21st-century Norwegian male singers